Poshteh Rizeh-ye Vosta (also Romanized as Poshteh Rīzeh-ye Vosţá) is a village in Sar Firuzabad Rural District, Firuzabad District, Kermanshah County, Kermanshah Province, Iran. At the 2006 census, its population was 103, in 20 families.

References 

Populated places in Kermanshah County